The Silverthrone Caldera is a potentially active caldera complex in southwestern British Columbia, Canada, located over  northwest of the city of Vancouver and about  west of Mount Waddington in the Pacific Ranges of the Coast Mountains.

The main glaciers in the Silverthrone area are the Pashleth, Kingcome, Trudel, Klinaklini and Silverthrone glaciers. Most of the caldera lies in  the Ha-Iltzuk Icefield, which is the largest icefield in the southern half of the Coast Mountains; it is one of the five icefields in southwestern British Columbia that thinned between the mid-1980s and 1999 due to global warming. Nearly half of the icefield is drained by the Klinaklini Glacier, which feeds the Klinaklini River.

The Silverthrone Caldera is very remote and rarely visited or studied by geoscientists, such as volcanologists. It can be reached by helicopter or — with major difficulty — by hiking along one of the several river valleys extending from the British Columbia Coast or from the Interior Plateau.

Geology
Silverthrone is part of the Pemberton Volcanic Belt, which is circumscribed by a group of epizonal intrusions. At another deeply eroded caldera complex called Franklin Glacier Complex, the Pemberton Volcanic Belt merges with the Garibaldi Volcanic Belt, a northwest-trending belt of volcanic cones and fields extending from near the Canada–United States border east of Vancouver on the British Columbia Coast. The intrusions are thought to be subvolcanic bodies associated with a volcanic front that was active in the Miocene, during early stages of subduction of the Juan de Fuca Plate. With the notable exception of King Island, all the intrusive and eruptive rocks are calc-alkaline, mainly granodioritic bodies and dacite ejecta.

On a broader scale, the intrusive and eruptive rocks are part of the Coast Plutonic Complex, which is the single largest contiguous granite outcropping in North America. The intrusive and metamorphic rocks extend approximately  along the coast of British Columbia, the Alaska Panhandle and southwestern Yukon. This is a remnant of a once vast volcanic arc called the Coast Range Arc that formed as a result of subduction of the Farallon and Kula Plates during the Jurassic-to-Eocene periods. In contrast, Garibaldi, Meager, Cayley and Silverthrone areas are of recent volcanic origin.

Structure

Like other calderas, Silverthrone formed as a result of emptying the magma chamber beneath the volcano. If enough magma is erupted, the emptied chamber will not be able to support the weight of the volcanic edifice above it. A roughly circular fracture—a "ring fault"—develops around the edge of the chamber. These ring fractures serve as feeders for fault intrusions that are also known as ring dikes. Secondary volcanic vents may form above the ring fracture. As the magma chamber empties, the center of the volcano within the ring fracture begins to collapse. The collapse may occur as the result of a single cataclysmic eruption, or it may occur in stages as the result of a series of eruptions. The total area that collapses may be hundreds of thousands of square kilometers.

Steep contacts between the thick basal breccia of Mount Silverthrone and older crystalline rocks of adjacent peaks suggest that the breccia is part of a caldera-fill succession. The presence of irregular subvolcanic intrusions and a profusion of dikes within the breccia—but not in adjacent country rock—provide further evidence of the Silverthrone Caldera. Potassium-argon dates of 750,000 and 400,000 years on rhyolitic lava domes above the basal breccia are consistent with the high rates of uplift and erosion recorded elsewhere in the Coast Mountains.

Origins

The still largely unexplained tectonic causes of the volcanism that has produced the Silverthrone Caldera are a matter of ongoing research. Silverthrone is not above a hotspot as are Nazko or Hawaii. However, it may be a product of the Cascadia subduction zone because andesite, basaltic andesite, dacite and rhyolite can be found at the volcano and elsewhere along the subduction zone. At issue are the current plate configuration and rate of subduction but Silverthrone's chemistry indicates that Silverthrone is subduction related.

The Cascadia subduction zone is a long convergent plate boundary that separates the Juan de Fuca, Explorer, Gorda and North American Plates. Hot magma upwelling above the descending oceanic plate creates volcanoes, each of which erupts for a few million years. It is estimated that the subduction zone has existed for at least 37 million years; in that time it has created a line of volcanoes, called the Cascade Volcanic Arc, that stretches over  along the subduction zone from Northern California to Vancouver Island. Several volcanoes in the arc are potentially active. All of the known historic eruptions in the arc have been in the United States. Two of the most recent were Lassen Peak in 1914 to 1921 and the major eruption of Mount St. Helens in 1980. It is also the site of Canada's most recent major eruption, about 2,350 years ago at the Mount Meager massif.

Eruptive history

Very little is known about Silverthrone's eruptive history. However, as at other calderas, eruptions at Silverthrone are explosive in nature, involving viscous magma, glowing avalanches of hot volcanic ash and pyroclastic flows. The source magma of this rock is classified as acidic, having high to intermediate levels of silica, as in rhyolite, dacite, and andesite. Andesitic and rhyolitic magma are commonly associated with the two forms of explosive eruptions called Plinian and Peléan eruptions. Silverthrone is considerably younger than its nearest prominent neighbour Franklin Glacier Complex to the east-southeast.

The bulk of the complex appears to have been erupted between 100,000 and 500,000 years ago, but postglacial andesitic and basaltic andesite cones and lava flows are also present. This blocky lava flow is clearly much younger than the potassium-argon date, and high-energy glacial streams have only begun to etch a channel along the margin of the lava flow. The younger andesitic rocks issued from a cluster of vents, now mostly ice-covered, ranged around the periphery of the caldera. At high elevations, proximal breccia and cinders from several eroded cones rest on coarse colluvium derived from the older parts of the volcanic complex. The presence of unconsolidated glacial fluvial deposits under the flow suggest that it is less than 1,000 years old.

Although the particular Volcanic Explosivity Index (VEI) of the Silverthrone Caldera is unknown, the chemistry and structure of the volcano can be compared to other calderas that have a history of producing some of the world's most violent eruptions. Such calderas are usually formed by large cataclysmic eruptions reaching 7 on the Volcanic Explosivity Index (described as "super-colossal").

Current activity
Silverthrone Caldera is one of the eleven Canadian volcanoes associated with recent seismic activity: the others are Castle Rock, Mount Edziza, Mount Cayley, Hoodoo Mountain, The Volcano, Crow Lagoon, Mount Garibaldi, Mount Meager massif, Wells Gray-Clearwater Volcanic Field and Nazko Cone. Seismic data suggests that these volcanoes still contain live magma plumbing systems, indicating possible future eruptive activity. Although the available data does not allow a clear conclusion, these observations are further indications that some of Canada's volcanoes are potentially active, and that their associated hazards may be significant. The seismic activity correlates both with some of Canada's most youthful volcanoes, and with long-lived volcanic centers with a history of significant explosive behavior, such as the Silverthrone Caldera.

Volcanic hazards

Volcanic eruptions in Canada rarely cause fatalities because of their remoteness and low level of activity. The only known fatality due to volcanic activity in Canada occurred at the Tseax Cone in 1775, when a  lava flow traveled down the Tseax and Nass Rivers, destroying a Nisga'a village and killing approximately 2,000 people by volcanic gases. Towns and cities south of Silverthrone are home to well over half of British Columbia's human population, and there is a likelihood that future eruptions will cause damage to populated areas, making Silverthrone and other Garibaldi belt volcanoes further south a major potential hazard. For this reason, additional projects to study Silverthrone and other Garibaldi belt volcanoes to the south are being planned by the Geological Survey of Canada. There are significant hazards from almost all Canadian volcanoes that require hazard maps and emergency plans. Volcanoes which exhibit significant seismic activity, such as Silverthrone, appear to be most likely to erupt. A significant eruption of any of the Garibaldi belt volcanoes would significantly impact Highway 99 and communities like Pemberton, Whistler and Squamish, and possibly Vancouver.

Explosive eruptions
The explosive nature of past eruptions at Silverthrone Caldera suggests that this volcano poses a significant long-distance threat to communities across Canada. A large explosive eruption can produce large amounts of ash that could significantly affect communities across Canada. Ash columns could rise to several hundred meters above the volcano which would make this a hazard for air traffic along the coastal airway between Vancouver and Alaska. Volcanic ash reduces visibility and can cause jet engine failure as well as damage to other aircraft systems. In addition, pyroclastic fall could also have a deleterious effect on the Ha-Iltzuk Icefield surrounding the volcano. Melting of glacial ice could cause lahars or debris flows. This in turn could endanger water supplies on the Machmell River and other local water sources.

Lava flows
Because the Silverthrone region is in a remote and exceptionally rugged part of the Coast Mountains, danger from lava flows would be low to moderate. Magma with high to intermediate levels of silica (as in andesite, dacite or rhyolite) commonly move slowly and typically cover small areas to form steep-sided mounds called lava domes. Such flows will overlap one another and typically move less than a few meters per hour. But lava eruptions at Silverthrone Caldera can be more intense than those at other Cascade volcanoes. There is also evidence lava flows may have once partly blocked or at least altered the course of the Machmell River. Renewed activity in this area could disrupt the course of the river and have a serious impact on people living or working downstream.

Volcanic gas
Volcanic gas includes a variety of substances. These include gases trapped in cavities (vesicles) in volcanic rocks, dissolved or dissociated gases in magma and lava, or gases emanating directly from lava or indirectly through ground water heated by volcanic action. The volcanic gases that pose the greatest potential hazard to people, animals, agriculture, and property are sulfur dioxide, carbon dioxide and hydrogen fluoride. Locally, sulfur dioxide gas can lead to acid rain and air pollution downwind from the volcano. Globally, large explosive eruptions that inject a tremendous volume of sulfur aerosols into the stratosphere can lead to lower surface temperatures and promote weakening of the Earth's ozone layer. Because carbon dioxide gas is heavier than air, the gas may flow into low-lying areas and collect in the soil. The concentration of carbon dioxide gas in these areas can be lethal to people, animals, and vegetation.

Monitoring

Currently Silverthrone is not monitored closely enough by the Geological Survey of Canada to ascertain how active the volcano's magma system is. The existing network of seismographs has been established to monitor tectonic earthquakes and is too far away to provide a good indication of what is happening beneath the caldera. It may sense an increase in activity if the volcano becomes very restless, but this may only provide a warning for a large eruption. It might detect activity only after the volcano has started erupting.

A possible way to detect an eruption is studying Silverthrone's geological history since every volcano has its own pattern of behavior, in terms of its eruption style, magnitude and frequency, so that its future eruption is expected to be similar to its previous eruptions. But this would likely be abandoned in part because of the volcano's remoteness.

While there is a likelihood of Canada being critically affected by local or close by volcanic eruptions argues that some kind of improvement program is required. Benefit-cost thoughts are critical to dealing with natural hazards. However, a benefit-cost examination needs correct data about the hazard types, magnitudes and occurrences. These do not exist for volcanoes in British Columbia or elsewhere in Canada in the detail required.

Other volcanic techniques, such as hazard mapping, displays a volcano's eruptive history in detail and speculates an understanding of the hazardous activity that could possibly be expected in the future. At present no hazard maps have been created for the Silverthrone Caldera because the level of knowledge is insufficient due to its remoteness. A large volcanic hazard program has never existed within the Geological Survey of Canada. The majority of information has been collected in a lengthy, separate way from the support of several employees, such as volcanologists and other geologic scientists. Current knowledge is best established at the Mount Meager massif and is likely to rise considerably with a temporary mapping and monitoring project. Knowledge at the Silverthrone Caldera and other volcanoes in the Garibaldi Volcanic Belt is not as established, but certain contributions are being done at least Mount Cayley. An intensive program classifiying infrastructural exposure near all young Canadian volcanoes and quick hazard assessments at each individual volcanic edifice associated with recent seismic activity would be in advance and would produce a quick and productive determination of priority areas for further efforts.

The existing network of seismographs to monitor tectonic earthquakes has existed since 1975, although it remained small in population until 1985. Apart from a few short-term seismic monitoring experiments by the Geological Survey of Canada, no volcano monitoring has been accomplished at the Silverthrone Caldera or at other volcanoes in Canada at a level approaching that in other established countries with historically active volcanoes. Such monitoring detects the risk of an eruption, offering a forecasting capability which is important to mitigating volcanic risk. With increasing distance and declining numbers of seismographs used to indicate seismic activity, the prediction capability is reduced because earthquake location and depth measurement accuracy decreases. The location magnitude level in the Garibaldi Volcanic Belt is about magnitude 1 to 1.5, and elsewhere it is magnitude 1.5 to 2. At "carefully monitored volcanoes both the located and noticed events are recorded and surveyed immediately to improve the understanding of a future eruption. Undetected events are not recorded or surveyed in British Columbia immediately, nor in an easy-to-access process.

In countries like Canada it is possible that small precursor earthquake swarms might go undetected, particularly if no events were observed; more significant events in larger swarms would be detected but only a minor subdivision of the swarm events would be complex to clarify them with confidence as volcanic in nature, or even associate them with an individual volcanic edifice.

See also

 Cascade Volcanoes
 Coast Mountains
 Garibaldi Volcanic Belt
 Geology of the Pacific Northwest
 List of volcanoes in Canada
 Pacific Ranges
 Pemberton Volcanic Belt
 Volcanology of Canada
 Volcanology of Western Canada

References

External links

 Volcanoes of Canada Garibaldi Volcanic Belt (Silverthrone area)
 Catalogue of Canadian volcanoes - Silverthrone Caldera

Volcanoes of British Columbia
Subduction volcanoes
Complex volcanoes
Pleistocene lava domes
Calderas of British Columbia
Garibaldi Volcanic Belt
Pyroclastic cones
Pacific Ranges
Active volcanoes
Pleistocene calderas
Polygenetic volcanoes